Luis Arráez Martínez (1897–1940) was a Spanish Socialist Workers' Party politician. He was born in Almansa. He supported the Second Spanish Republic during the Spanish Civil War. After the victory of the Nationalists, he was executed by the government of Francisco Franco in Alicante.

References
Piqueras Arenas, Josep Antoni; Paniagua Fuentes, Francisco Javier: Diccionario biográfico de políticos valencianos: 1810-2006. Ed.: Centro Francisco Tomás y Valiente, 2006. 

1897 births
1940 deaths
Spanish Socialist Workers' Party politicians
People executed by Francoist Spain
Civil governors of Málaga
Civil governors of Toledo